Petr Kolář (born 27 September 1962) is a Czech politician.   He served as ambassador to Russia from 2010 through 2012. He is currently a senior advisor to the law firm of Squire Patton Boggs in Prague.

Early life 
Kolář graduated from Charles University in Prague in 1986 with majors in  information technology, library science and ethnography. His interests are international politics, sport, literature, history, fine arts. Kolář is married and has two children.

Diplomatic career 
Kolář has held numerous positions at the Ministry of Foreign Affairs. From 1996 to 1998, he served as Czech Ambassador to Sweden. In 1999, Kolář became Ambassador to Ireland. He left the office in 2003. From 1 September 2003 to 12 October 2005, he was Deputy Foreign Affairs Minister for Bilateral Relations. Until the end of June 2010 he was the Ambassador of the Czech Republic to the United States.

References 

1962 births
Charles University alumni
Politicians from České Budějovice
Living people
Ambassadors of the Czech Republic to Russia
Ambassadors of the Czech Republic to the United States
People associated with Squire Patton Boggs